One Day in April is a 2015 feature-length documentary produced by Life Is My Movie Entertainment. The film follows four teams of college cyclists as they prepare for the Indiana University Little 500, a collegiate bicycle race held each year in Bloomington, Indiana.

The film premiered on April 24, 2015.

Synopsis
One Day in April is an intimate look at what goes on in the months leading up to a big college cycling race like Bloomington Indiana's "Little 500."  The film stars two teams of cyclists, a women's and a men's team, as well as their coaches, families, and friends who support them through the ups and downs of training for the race.  One Day in April also goes behind the scenes to show the organizers of the event and just what goes into creating and maintaining a level of non-profit integrity that may be considered rare in the modern world of college sports.

Reception
The film received positive reviews from cyclists, alumni, and critics. "Her Campus" wrote; "This movie is an ode to IU, the Little 500 race and the Midwest itself."

See also
 Breaking Away
 Indiana University 
 Little 500

References

External links
 
 

2015 films
American independent films
American documentary films
Documentary films about economics
Documentary films about Indiana
Films shot in Indiana
2015 documentary films
2010s English-language films
2010s American films